Vera Fyodorovna Komissarzhevskaya (8 November 1864 – 23 February 1910) was one of the most celebrated actresses and theatre managers of the late Russian Empire. She made her professional debut in 1893, after having acted as an amateur at Constantin Stanislavsky's Society of Art and Literature. She is probably best known today for originating the role of Nina in the ill-fated premiere of Anton Chekhov's The Seagull, at the Alexandrinsky Theatre in Saint Petersburg in 1896. Though the production was deemed an utter failure, Komissarzhevskaya's performance was highly praised.

Later in her career, Komissarzhevskaya is notable for her patronage of the up-and-coming theatre artist, Vsevolod Meyerhold. Following Meyerhold's unsuccessful attempts to stage symbolist plays at Stanislavsky's Moscow Art Theatre, Komissarzhevskaya invited him to try his experiments at her new Dramatic Theatre. During their short-lived collaboration, the two managed to develop Meyerhold's symbolist aesthetic and Komissarzhevskaya herself starred in two of the most critically and commercially successful productions.

Life and work
Komissarzhevskaya was born in Saint Petersburg, into a wealthy and distinguished family. Her father was the celebrated Russian opera singer Fyodor Komissarzhevsky, a leading tenor at the Mariinsky Theatre, and her mother, Mariya Nikolaevna Shulgina, was the daughter of General Nikolai Shulgin, a war hero and officer in the Preobrazhensky regiment. Komissarzhevskaya had a close relationship with her father, and she frequently corresponded with Komissarzhevsky. Towards the end of his life, he wrote to Mariya Nikolaevna, saying:

This commitment to his daughter's life and work was a testament to her favor, as her half-brother was Theodore Komisarjevsky, a famous theatrical director in his own right.  Fyodor actually educated both Vera and Theodore in the art of acting from an early age. Fyodor was a respected acting teacher with many other successful students, such as Konstantin Stanislavsky. 

At the age of 19, Komissarzhevskaya married the painter Count , but preferred to keep her stage name even after the marriage. Some years later, she was broken-hearted to discover that her sister was pregnant with Muravyov's child, and she left him, throwing herself into her acting career. In  1891, she played the role of Betsy in the first Russian production of Leo Tolstoy's The Fruits of Enlightenment under the direction of Stanislavsky. In 1896, she began working at Saint Petersburg's Alexandrinsky Theatre, performing in roles such as Rosy in Battle of the Butterflies by Hermann Sudermann and as Larisa in Alexander Ostrovsky's Without a Dowry. Perhaps her greatest triumph at the Alexandrinsky however, was the role of Nina Zarechnaya in the premiere of Chekhov's The Seagull (1897). The production was initially unsuccessful, with Komissarzhevskaya being heckled by the audience so extremely, that she lost her voice during opening night of the production. However, the rest of the run proved successful, and The Seagull made Komissarzhevskaya a star.

Komissarzhevskaya was not alone in embracing new ideas for she lived during a time of transition. And like the changing times in which she lived, her performance of self changed greatly and frequently during her lifetime. Reacting consciously and subconsciously to a variety of factors in her history and personal makeup, she changed her persona, her perceivable self to optimize her chances of success in life. 

In 1904, Komissarzhevskaya founded her own theatre in Saint Petersburg, where she appeared in productions of Chekhov's Ivanov and Uncle Vanya, and as Desdemona in William Shakespeare's Othello, Ophelia in Hamlet, and Nora in Ibsen's A Doll's House.

Komissarzhevskaya shared prominence with renowned actress Marriia Ermolova and Marriaa Savina, and although a much less flamboyant personage than colleague theatre entrepreneur Lidiia Iavorskaia, Kommissarchevskias Dramatic Theatres (1904-09) were acclaimed as St Petersburg's practical and theoretical cousin to Konstantin Stalnivisky's Moscow Arts Theatre.

Tiring of the nineteenth-century theatre's routine scenarios and the dominant naturalistic trends of the time, however, Komissarzhevskaya boldly extended an invitation to the young director Vsevolod Meyerhold. Though they found some success with Komissarzhevskaya starring in the title roles of Ibsen's Hedda Gabler and Maeterlink's Sister Beatrice, the collaboration proved unfruitful. Meyerhold failed to create a role that catered to Komissarzhevskaya's acting style, a mixture of intense emotional sensitivity with high theatrical seriousness. She dismissed him after just one year, and spent the remainder of her career touring old productions in the United States and Europe, an attempt to raise enough money to pay for the enormous debt she had amassed.

Even after her exit from Russia, Komissarzhevskaya's fame was such that when she died of smallpox in 1910, her funeral was attended by vast crowds of mourners, and even occasioned some poignant lyrics from the Russian poet Alexander Blok. One of the major theatres of St. Petersburg still bears her name and, in 1980 there was even a biographical film made about the actress' life and career called, Ya - aktrisa ("I am an actress"), starring Natalia Saiko.

Reactions to Komissarzhevskaya's death demonstrate the social importance of ideas of sincere emotion and authentic selfhood as part of a larger search for transcendent individuals in the late imperial public sphere.

Her unexpected death in 1910 became a major public event and media sensation, prompting an enormous outpouring of mourning throughout the Russian Empire and extensive commentary in the press that demonstrated her significant social resonance and place in debates on pressing concerns animating late imperial Russia.

References

External links

 Brief biography

1864 births
1910 deaths
Deaths from smallpox
Infectious disease deaths in Uzbekistan
Actresses from Saint Petersburg
19th-century actresses from the Russian Empire
Russian stage actresses
20th-century Russian actresses
Burials at Tikhvin Cemetery
19th-century theatre managers
19th-century businesswomen from the Russian Empire
Theatre directors from Saint Petersburg